Anne Chambers is an Irish biographer, novelist, and screenplay writer who lives and works in Dublin, and is best known for her biography of the 16th-century Irish Pirate Queen, Grace O'Malley.

Early life and education 
Chambers grew up in Castlebar, Ireland.

Chambers has a masters degree in History from the Convent of Mercy Castlebar.

Chambers initially worked as an executive at Central Bank, but left the job to pursue writing.

Books 

 Grace O'Malley : The Biography of Ireland's Pirate Queen 1530-1603 (1979); Gill.
 Shadow Lord (2007); biography of Tibbot ne Long Bourke, 1st Viscount Mayo, Gráinne Ní Mháille's youngest son.
 Finding Tom Cruise (2007)
 Eleanor Countess of Desmond (2011)
 T.K. Whitaker: Portrait of a Patriot (2014)
 The Great Leviathan: the life of Howe Peter Browne, 2nd Marquess of Sligo (1788-1845)

Awards 
Chambers received the Wild Atlantic Words Hall of Fame Award in 2018.

Adaptations 
Chambers has written several adaptations of her biography of Grace O'Malley, including a play, a biopic, and a screenplay for a six part mini-series, which as of November 2022 was in development with Kristen Sheridan.

References

External links
Official Internet Site
Official Blog

Irish women novelists
Year of birth missing (living people)
Living people
Irish biographers
Irish screenwriters
Irish women screenwriters
Women biographers